The pool stage of the 2000–01 European Challenge Cup.

Pool 1

Pool 2

Pool 3

Pool 4

Pool 5

Pool 6

Pool 7

Pool 8

See also
European Challenge Cup
2000–01 Heineken Cup

References

pool stage
2000–01